The T'hó Mayas Fútbol Club is a Mexican football club based in Homún, Yucatán. The club was founded in 2022, and currently plays in the Serie B of Liga Premier.

History
The team was founded in May 2022, although during its first years it competed in amateur leagues. In July 2022, the team began procedures to join the Mexican Football Federation, finally in July the club was accepted into the Liga Premier de México, being placed in Serie B, for which it began to compete in professional soccer in Mexico.

After the presentation, the team announced its first steps as a professional squad. The club introduced David Patiño as its first coach and later unveiled a project to build a soccer stadium and an attached complex, which will be located in Acanceh. However, while these works are carried out, the team will temporarily play in Homún. The board intends to reach Serie A de México in a year and the Liga de Expansión MX in a period of between 3 and 5 years.

Players

First-team squad

References

Association football clubs established in 2022
Football clubs in Yucatán
2022 establishments in Mexico
Liga Premier de México